Mitchell May (July 10, 1870 – March 24, 1961) was an American lawyer and politician from New York. From 1899 to 1901, he served one term in the U.S. House of Representatives.

Life
He attended the public schools and Brooklyn Polytechnic Institute. He graduated from Columbia University Law School in 1892, was admitted to the bar in 1893, and commenced practice in Brooklyn.

Congress 
May was elected as a Democrat to the 56th United States Congress, and served from March 4, 1899, to March 3, 1901. From 1906 to 1910, he was a member of the New York City Board of Education. He was an Assistant District Attorney of Kings County from 1910 to 1911.

Later political career 
He was Secretary of State of New York from 1913 to 1914, elected in 1912, but defeated for re-election in 1914. He was county judge of Kings County from 1916 to 1921, and was a justice of the New York State Supreme Court from 1922 to 1940, when he retired after reaching the constitutional age limit. Afterwards he resumed the practice of law.

Later career 
According to a biographer of Governor Al Smith, May played a role in desegregating a New York country club.  As told by Hugh Carey, Smith and May were about to tee off when club officials attempted to stop them because of May's religion—the club did not admit Jewish members.  Smith replied that either May would play the round with him, or Smith would have the golf course turned into a state park within a week.  They played, and the club changed its membership policy.

Entertainment industry 
May was acquainted with several people involved in the entertainment industry, and presided over the ceremony for the second marriage of Frank Capra.

Death and burial 
He died on May 24, 1961 and was buried at Staten Island's Valhalla Cemetery, also known as Ocean View. May was the last surviving Representative to have served in the 19th century.

Religion 
He was of Jewish faith.

See also
List of Jewish members of the United States Congress

References

External links

Mitchell May at Jewish Telegraphic Agency

1870 births
1961 deaths
Politicians from Brooklyn
Columbia Law School alumni
New York (state) lawyers
New York (state) state court judges
New York Supreme Court Justices
Secretaries of State of New York (state)
Democratic Party members of the United States House of Representatives from New York (state)
Jewish members of the United States House of Representatives
Burials in New York (state)